Royal Air Force Swingfield or more simply RAF Swingfield is a former Royal Air Force Advanced Landing Ground located  north west of Dover, Kent and  south of Aylesham, Kent. The airfield was operational between February 1917 and 28 April 1945.

History
The airfield was used by both the Royal Flying Corps and the Royal Air Force opening during February 1917 and closing on 28 April 1945.

Based units
 No. 157 (General Reconnaissance) Wing RAF
 No. 119 Squadron RAF flying Fairey Albacores between 9 August 1944 and 2 October 1944
 819 Naval Air Squadron

References

Citations

Bibliography

Royal Flying Corps airfields
Royal Flying Corps airfields in Kent
Royal Air Force stations in Kent
Royal Air Force stations of World War II in the United Kingdom